The social flycatcher (Myiozetetes similis) is a passerine bird from the Americas, a member of the large tyrant flycatcher family (Tyrannidae).

It is sometimes split into two species with the social flycatcher, Myiozetetes texensis, from Costa Rica northwards to Mexico and the vermilion-crowned flycatcher, M. similis proper, from southwest Costa Rica across South America.

Description
In appearance, the social flycatcher resembles a smaller boat-billed flycatcher or great kiskadee. The head is dark grey with a strong white eyestripe and a usually concealed orange to vermilion crown stripe. The upperparts are olive-brown, and the wings and tail are brown with only faint rufous fringes. The underparts are yellow and the throat is white. Young birds have a paler eye mask, reduced crown stripe, and have chestnut fringes to the wing and tail feathers. The call is a sharp peeurrr and the dawn song is a chips-k’-cheery.

As the specific epithet similis (Latin for "the similar one") indicates, this species looks much like its closest living relative the rusty-margined flycatcher (Myiozetetes cayanensis), and also like the white-bearded flycatcher (Phelpsia inornatus), white-ringed flycatcher (Conopias albovittatus) and lesser kiskadee (Pitangus/Philohydor lictor). In fact, except at close range, these are all but indistinguishable from appearance alone. They and the two larger similar species mentioned above share much of their range. Though they all are apparently fairly close relatives, the group to which they seem to belong also includes species with rather different head-pattern, like the grey-capped flycatcher which also belongs to Myiozetetes.

Range and ecology

Social flycatchers breed in plantations, pasture with some trees, and open woodland from northwestern Mexico south to northeastern Peru, southern Brazil and northwestern Argentina. It is a common and wide-ranging species and thus not considered threatened by the IUCN.

They like to perch openly in trees, several meters above ground. From such perches they will sally out for considerable distances to catch insects in flight, to which purpose they utilize a range of aerobatic maneuvers. They also regularly hover and glean for prey and small berries—e.g. from gumbo-limbo (Bursera simaruba), which they seek out and also utilize in human-modified habitat such as secondary forest or urban parks and gardens—and will pick off prey from the ground and even enter shallow waters to feed on aquatic invertebrates, tadpoles and occasionally small fish. They have been observed to forage peacefully alongside common marmosets (Callithrix jacchus) in the undergrowth, maybe even cooperating with the monkeys in flushing prey from hiding. Perhaps this behavior only occurs during the dry season, when fruits are scarcer; it has been noted that they do not join mixed-species feeding flocks very often.

The nest, built by the female in a bush, tree or on a building, is a large roofed structure of stems and straw, which for protection is often built near a wasp, bee or ant nest, or the nest of another tyrant flycatcher. The nest site is often near or over water. The typical clutch is two to four brown- or lilac-blotched cream or white eggs, laid between February and June.

Image gallery

References

Further reading

External links

 
 
 
 

social flycatcher
Birds of Central America
Birds of South America
social flycatcher